Palladius may refer to:

People:
Palladius of Antioch (died 309), also known as Palladius the Hermit, Christian saint
Rutilius Taurus Aemilianus Palladius, 4th-century Roman agricultural writer usually known as Palladius
Palladius of Ratiaria, late 4th-century Arian Christian theologian
Palladius (prefect), prefect of Alexandria in 373
Palladius of Galatia (360s–420s) also known as Palladius Helenopolitanus, the author of Historia Lausiaca
Junius Quartus Palladius, Praetorian Prefect in the Western Roman Empire in the early 5th century
Palladius (Caesar) (420–455), son of Western Roman Emperor Petronius Maximus, Caesar of the Western Roman Empire
Palladius (bishop of Ireland) (fl. 408-431; died ca. 457/461), also known as Palladius the Deacon, first Bishop of the Christians of Ireland, preceding Saint Patrick
Palladius of Embrun (died ca. 541 AD), also known as Pallade, Pélade, Patllari, bishop of Embrun
Palladius of Saintes, or Pallais of Saintes, 6th-century bishop of Saintes in Gaul  
Palladius (physician), 6th or 7th century, author of two books of commentary on Hippocrates
Peder Palladius (1503–1560), first Lutheran bishop of the Church of Denmark
Palladius (Kafarov) (1817–1878), named as Archimandrite Palladius or Pyotr Kafarov, early Russian sinologist, author of the standard Russian transcription scheme for Chinese words

Other uses 
 Palladius table, a table of Palladius system syllables for the cyrillization of Chinese
Palladius (wine), a cult wine label by the Sadie Family, a South African producer

See also
 Palladio (disambiguation)
 Palladium (disambiguation)
 Palladas